Honkytonk Revival is the second studio album by Canadian country artist Jade Eagleson. It was released on November 12, 2021 via Starseed Records. The album features three singles: "All Night to Figure It Out", "More Drinkin' Than Fishin', and "She Don't Know". Each single reached number one on the Canada Country chart, making Eagleson the second Canadian country artist to land three consecutive number ones from their second studio album, following Shania Twain who accomplished this feat with The Woman in Me in 1995. The album was named "Top Selling Canadian Album" at the 2022 Canadian Country Music Awards.

Background
Eagleson aimed to return to the sound of neotraditional country with the release of Honkytonk Revival, citing George Strait, Alan Jackson, Randy Travis, and Shania Twain as artists he listened to growing up that influenced the sound of this album. He remarked that it was "important to have the same sounds" as his "heroes" on the album, and was pleased to have Brent Mason playing lead guitar on the tracks. Eagleson noted that he is "very big" on "making people smile" with his music.

Critical reception
Kim Hughes of Parton and Pearl reviewed the album favourably, stating that it is "studiously well-crafted," "buoyed by the top tools of the trade and by a slick 90s-era country sensibility," while noting the prevalence of "fiddles, dobro, [and] steel guitars". She said that while the lyrics are "built for belted singalongs," they are also "especially compelling on closer listen". Eric Volmers of the Calgary Herald stated that Eagleson is "blessed with an earthy baritone that makes every word convey old-school authenticity, which perhaps lets him get away with having his tongue planted in his cheek on many of those drinking songs" on the album.

Track listing

Charts

Singles

Awards and nominations

Release history

References

2021 albums
Jade Eagleson albums
Albums produced by Todd Clark